Mohammed bin Abdullah bin Mohammed Al Yousef Al-Sulaiti is the Qatari Minister of State for Cabinet Affairs. He was appointed as minister on 19 October 2021.

References 

Living people
21st-century Qatari politicians
Qatari politicians
Government ministers of Qatar
Year of birth missing (living people)